Justina Jovaišytė (born 8 February 1998) is a Lithuanian racing cyclist. She rode in the women's road race event at the 2017 UCI Road World Championships.

References

External links

1998 births
Living people
Lithuanian female cyclists
Place of birth missing (living people)